Tsaritsyno (literal meaning "Tsaritsa's property") is a palace museum and park reserve in the south of Moscow. 

It was founded in the 1775 as the summer residence of Empress Catherine II, but the construction had a somewhat dramatic fate and was not completed. For most of its history, it was a half-abandoned landscape park with picturesque ruins, until in the 2000s the palace ensemble was restored according to the original plan. Now it is a museum complex and a popular leisure place for Muscovites and guests of the Russian capital.

History

During the Russian Empire

Before Catherine the Great 
The area has been known since the 16th century at the name of Bogorodskoye (belonged to Tsaritsa Irina, sister of Tsar Boris Godunov.). Over the course of two centuries, it changed several noble owners (including Streshnevs and Galitzines), until finally, in 1775, Catherine the Great bought it from the then owner, Prince Cantemir.

During the time of Catherine the Great 
Fascinated by the beauty of the site, she decided to arrange a summer residence there. The idea was enthusiastically supported by her longtime favorite, Grigory Potemkin (he is also believed to be an author of an estate's solemn name, "Tsaritsyno"). An important role in the future fate of Tsaritsyno was played by the fact that it is located in an area that at that time was a suburb of Moscow, and the capital in the 18th century was in Saint Petersburg (the distance between two sites is 650 km, and Catherine did not visit Moscow every year).

In the same 1775, the Empress gave the task to her court architect, Vasily Bazhenov, to develop a project for a summer residence near Moscow (in letters of that time, Catherine called the architect “my Bazhenov”, which indicates her special attitude towards him). The empress expressed several wishes: that the building be in the "Moorish" or "Gothic style", and that the park be arranged as a landscape park — both wishes corresponded to the fashion of the late 18th century. It is important that this project was the first task of this kind for a Russian architect: from the time of Peter I to Elizabeth Petrovna, foreign architects were mainly involved in the construction of imperial residences.

Bazhenov’s project

Bazhenov designed the palace in the Neo-Gothic and Moscow Baroque styles, but at the same time under the strong influence of the then popular classicism.

He planned Tsaritsyno as a whole little town: there were five palaces for Catherine II and her son Tsarevich Pavel Petrovich with his family in the center; around - multiple buildings for the court noblemen, servants' houses, pavilions. The ensemble was completed by bridges, and decorative constructions, as well as the Hlebnyi Dom (literally: "Bread House", Kitchen Building), an imposing building, which, nevertheless, fit into the surroundings in such a way that it did not overwhelm neighboring structures with its size.

The peculiarity of the layout of the Tsaritsyno buildings is such that it allows us to speak of the "poetry of geometry": there are various - always correct, symmetrical - geometric figures. Pavilions are in the form of six- and octahedrons, cruciform; The Small Palace is in the form of a semicircle; the Kitchen Building is in the form of a square with rounded corners. The same applies to the internal layout: round, oval and semi-oval halls are masterfully combined with rectangular halls. It is important to note that Bazhenov designed almost all the interiors of the Tsaritsyno buildings with vaulted ceilings, which achieved an even greater effect of the play of geometric shapes.

Landscape park was planned simultaneously with the buildings.

One of the main features of the Bazhenov's project was that there was no main palace as a single object - it fell apart into three independent buildings: the central one with front rooms (the Grand Cavalier Corps), and the right and left palaces with the private chambers of the empress and the heir to the throne. This decision was dictated by the idea of preserving the natural environment, and including the landscape into the overall appearance of the manor. A green lawn framed by three buildings was meant to become an important element of the composition.

The architect, innovatively solving the problem of Tsaritsyno planning, abandoned the traditional structure of the royal residences, placing the main volumes of palace buildings in the center of the composition instead of the front square.

Catherine II liked the project, and construction began in May 1776. Three buildings were started (Small and Middle Palaces and the Third Cavalry Corps), plus some pavilions and the Figured Bridge. The work was progressing successfully: as soon as August, Bazhenov reported that the Figured Bridge was almost completed, and “the other three palaces have already been half-done, and will certainly be finished to an end this summer, if there will be no bad weather”.

However, by the end of the year, troubles arose with building supplies and funding; this was repeated several times throughout the construction, which lasted for a decade - contrary to the architect's plans to finish it all in three years. Bazhenov wrote numerous letters to officials, trying to find out the reasons for the difficulties. Nevertheless, despite money and material shortages, the previously begun buildings were completed in 1777-1778, and in 1777 the construction of the Figured Gate and the main palace, which consisted of three buildings, began. It ended in 1782; at the same time, work for the Large Cavalry Corps, several outbuildings, and an arch-gallery were started.

In order for construction to not stop, Bazhenov even had to take out loans in his own name and carry out construction at his own expense. While working on the Tsaritsyno ensemble, Bazhenov was forced to sell his house in Moscow, along with all the furniture and the library. By 1784, Bazhenov had about 15 thousand rubles in debt.

Finally, at the beginning of the year 1784, 100000 rubles were allocated to complete the construction. The unexpected generosity of the treasury was due to the fact that the next year the empress planned a trip to Moscow.

In early June 1785, ten years after the beginning of construction, Catherine II arrived in Moscow. The visit was brief and somewhat unexpected - at first, the Empress planned her visit later.

She wished to inspect the Tsaritsyno without delay. Catherine, accompanied by a small retinue, went to Tsaritsyno in a roundabout way, bypassing the main entrances, as she was frightened by rumors of a possible assassination attempt - the empress did not have a chance to admire the majestic views from the main entrance to Tsaritsyno, designed by Bazhenov. She briefly inspected the palace and left it very disappointed.

The verdict of the empress after a quick inspection was harsh: the money spent on construction  was wasted, the stairs are narrow, the ceilings are heavy, the rooms and boudoirs are cramped, the halls are dark, like cellars. Catherine ordered "to make a fair amount of deconstruction" and to present a new project for the main palace.

It is hard to imagine that an extremely gifted architect, who had previously successfully built numerous buildings, could have miscalculated proportions so roughly. Additionally, the Tsaritsyno buildings were approved personally by the Empress, everything was built with her approval; she knew the approximate dimensions of future buildings and interiors beforehand. It is also unlikely that the architect would have dared to contradict the wishes of Catherine herself. Most likely, Catherine's verdict - "it's impossible to live here" - was only an excuse for removing Bazhenov. 

Historians now agree that the main reason is that by year 1785 Bazhenov's palace layout became politically incorrect: relations between Catherine and Crown Prince Paul irreversibly worsened, the empress have a thoughts of removing Paul from the order of succession completely, and twin palaces had to make way for a single one – her own. 

Another reason for the royal anger could be Bazhenov's affiliation with the Masons (the architect underwent an initiation ceremony in 1784 on the guarantee of the educator and publisher N.I. Novikov, and was admitted to the Deucalion lodge), and his secret contacts with Tsarevich Pavel Petrovich. The attitude of the empress towards her son is well known: she disliked him and did not allow him to rule the empire, kept him away from making important state decisions. One of the goals of the Russian Freemasons was to attract the heir to the throne into their organization. Vasily Bazhenov was chosen by the "brothers" as a courier-intermediary between the Moscow Masons and the Tsarevich. Often traveling to St. Petersburg on business of the Tsaritsyno construction, the architect secretly visited the "small court", met Pavel, and gave him Masonic literature. It is worth noting that Bazhenov did not have high “degrees” (Masonic ranks) among the Masons and did not take any other active part in the Masonic movement. Anyway, the secret became clear: during the visit of the Empress to Moscow in 1785, she was informed about the activities of Moscow Freemasons, including secret contacts with the heir. Probably, Catherine suspected the beginning of a conspiracy and decided to nip it in the bud. Also in 1785, N.I. Novikov, one of the most prominent Russian Freemasons and a close friend of the Bazhenov, began to have serious problems with the authorities. The culmination of the "Novikov case" was his arrest in 1792; Vasily Bazhenov’s note, dated 1784, appeared as evidence against him, in which the architect reported on a secret meeting with the Tsarevich (Novikov did not destroy it due to an oversight). Bazhenov was not involved in the investigation - apparently, the empress considered that he had already been punished enough.

Bazhenov's freemasonry was highly reflected in the Tsaritsyno buildings. The decor of many buildings, the mysterious lacy stone patterns, clearly resemble Masonic ciphers and emblems. Tsaritsyno is often referred to as the "architectural reference book" of Masonic symbols of the 18th century; the very construction of the ensemble, its layout is sometimes also considered a kind of Masonic cipher. The Masonic symbols of Tsaritsyno were repeatedly tried to decipher, but without any reliable result; now it is admitted that this is not yet possible.

Anyway, whatever the reason was, the decision of the empress made a proper impression on people: it was obvious that Vasily Bazhenov fell into disgrace. Bazhenov was immediately removed from construction, his student, Matvey Kazakov, was appointed the new architect of the Tsaritsyno residence, which was another humiliation for the retired architect.

The Empress ordered Kazakov to build a new palace as a single building.

More than six months passed after Catherine II's inspection of the Tsaritsyno before a new project for palace development was approved. There were rumors that during this time M. M. Izmailov, head of the "Kremlin expedition of constructions", who was entrusted by the empress to supervise the alteration, offered help to Bazhenov in returning the favor of the empress. Together with Matvey Kazakov, they decided to do the following: Bazhenov was meant to prepare a new version of the palace and present to Catherine it through Izmailov earlier than Kazakov does. Probably it did not work out: it is not known for certain whether Catherine got acquainted with the new Bazhenov project or not. It is only known that in January 1786 Bazhenov was dismissed for a year from the posts assigned to him. Official reason was "to improve his health". For Bazhenov (after the another unrealized project of the Kremlin temple) it became a trauma that caused a serious mental shock.The fruits of ten years of work, to which he gave all his forces, turned out to be unclaimed. He never returned to the post of court architect under Catherine.

Kazakov’s Big Palace

Catherine chose Kazakov as a successor, because she was in awe of his previously built buildings. She was especially impressed by Moscow Kremlin Senate, which was also under construction during her 1785 visit, and which she also inspected. The latter was designed in a classicism style, very popular in the 1780s, and Empress began to prefer such buildings too.

By February 1786, Kazakov prepared a project for the Grand Palace, and it was approved by the Empress. In March, the dismantling of two buildings began - the chambers of Catherine and Tsarevich Pavel; On July 18 (29) there was groundbreaking for a new palace "according to the newly confirmed plan made by the architect Kazakov."

As mentioned, the palace was designed in a classicist style, and was way bigger than the already built Tsarytsyno buildings. It was in somewhat visual conflict with the existing composition. However, this project also faced a difficult fate.Firstly, for Kazakov Tsarytsyno was not the favorite child, as it was for Bazhenov. He also was occupied by other projects, and Big Palace construction was often supervised by his proxies.

Secondly, it was obvious that in the late 1780s Catherine II lost interest in her property near Moscow: funds allocated for the implementation of the project became more and more insufficient. After 1785, she visited Moscow only once, and even only in transit - in 1787, returning from her famous trip to the annexed Crimea. Perhaps Catherine was already ready to completely abandon Tsaritsyno - the need for Tsarskoe Selo near Moscow was felt less and less - but Grigory Potemkin unobtrusively insisted on completing the manor. He also volunteered to finance the long-term construction.And yet, in 1790, construction of the palace was stopped - presumably due to financial difficulties caused by the new Russian-Turkish war. And in October 1791, Prince Potemkin-Tavrichesky, the inspirer of the Tsaritsyno's plan, suddenly died.

Nevertheless, in 1793, seven years after the groundbreaking of the new palace, Catherine II returned to the Tsaritsyno construction, but significant changes were made to the original Kazakov's project. The height of the palace was reduced by one floor by her order. The architect had to hastily prepare a new project, taking into account the fact that the palace was half-built. The change in the height of the building has led to the fact that its silhouette has become somewhat blurry; a violation of the original proportions affected the architectural cohesion of the parts of the palace. However, the reduction in the height of the building made it possible to better fit it into the existing Bazhenov buildings, but it was not possible to achieve a complete harmony.

In November 1796, Catherine the Great suddenly died. At this time, the construction of the Grand Tsaritsyno Palace had been roughly completed. The building was covered with a temporary roof. Interior finishing work had begun; when all work in Tsaritsyno was stopped, 17 rooms of the Big Palace had parquet floors and ceilings. In the remaining Bazhenov buildings no interior decoration was carried out for the entire previous decade. The new Emperor Paul I visited Tsaritsyno after his coronation in March 1797 and did not like it. On June 8 (19) of the same year, a decree was issued "not to produce any buildings in the village of Tsaritsyno." In the future, the development of the Tsaritsyno buildings did not resume, and the palace ensemble, so long and difficult to build for Vasily Bazhenov and Matvey Kazakov, never became a residential imperial residence.

Imperial residence after Catherine 

The unfinished royal residence quickly fell into disrepair. Already at the very beginning of the 19th century, buildings began to collapse and overgrow with greenery like classical ruins.

The emperors following Catherine: Pavel I, Alexander I, Nicholas I, Alexander II, were not particularly interested in Tsaritsyno, did not live there, and did not try to complete the construction.

However, starting from the reign of Alexander I, the Tsaritsyno park became available for "promenades". Catherine's grandson followed the example of his grandmother: during her reign, the imperial gardens and parks were also open to the "noble public".

However, the first decade of the 19th century in Tsaritsyno is associated with the activities of P. S. Valuev, the head of the “Kremlin Expedition of Buildings”, and I. V. Egotov, a student of Bazhenov and Kazakov, who was the director of the “Kremlin Drawing Expedition” since 1803 . Under the leadership of Ivan Egotov, the design of a landscape park was completed: instead of several wooden Bazhenov pavilions, stone park pavilions and gazebos (Milovida, Nerastankino, Temple of Ceres) were built. Alleys, paths and bridges were equipped; artificial islands were designed on the Tsaritsyno ponds. Since then, Tsaritsyno has acquired its romantic halo and has become a popular place for picnics, horse riding and hiking among Muscovites. Valuev paid special attention to the development of the Tsaritsyno orchards and greenhouses. Greenhouses, laid down in the early years of the construction of Tsaritsyno, became a highly profitable part of the Tsaritsyn economics by the 1820s; exotic fruits and decorative plants grown in Tsaritsyno were famous throughout all  of Moscow.

Finally, in 1860, after an audit that admitted that the maintenance of the estate did not bring significant income, Tsaritsyno was transferred from the department that managed the royal property to the Department of Appanages. Thus, Tsaritsyno ceased to be the personal property of the imperial family.

Becoming a state property: Tsarytsyno-Dachnoe 

After becoming state property, Tsaritsyno was meant to generate income. At first it was supposed to sell all the buildings for demolition for 82,000 rubles, but no buyer was found. At the same time, Moscow authorities decided to lease out part of the Tsaritsyno lands for dacha development. The idea was hampered by the lack of transport links with Moscow, but the situation changed in 1865, when the "Tsaritsyno'' station of the newly built Kursk railway was opened  (it was even renamed to Tsaritsyno-Dachnoye in 1904). The plans for dacha development mainly affected the territories located to the west of the palaces and the historical park; but at the same time, part of the palace estate was also given over to dachas. This part included the First and Third Cavalier Corps with the adjacent palace territories, as well as the fields with greenhouses and orchards from the east.

Tsaritsyno quickly became a popular holiday destination; in the 1870s, a whole summer cottage village Novoe Tsaritsyno came into existence. Over the years, many celebrities rented dachas here or visited friends and relatives: writers F. M. Dostoevsky, F. I. Tyutchev, A. N. Pleshcheev, A. P. Chekhov, I. A. Bunin (here he met his future second wife, Vera Muromtseva), Leonid Andreev, Andrei Bely, N. D. Teleshov, composers M. A. Balakirev and P. I. Tchaikovsky, historians I. E. Zabelin and V. O. Klyuchevsky, naturalist K. A. Timiryazev, Chairman of the First State Duma S. A. Muromtsev. By the beginning of the 20th century, there were about a thousand dachas in Tsaritsyno and nearby villages, despite the fact that those dachas were considered extremely expensive.

The condition of the ownerless palace buildings steadily worsened. Abandoned greenhouses were demolished; some buildings and pavilions were occasionally used, and so underwent cosmetic repairs. But most of the buildings were still in disrepair. In 1880 there was a partial collapse of the roof of the Grand Tsaritsyno Palace; in order to avoid accidents, it was decided to remove the remnants of the roof and dismantle the frames of the "Gothic" decor of the towers.

During the years of Soviet Union 
In the first years of Soviet power, the "historical" Tsaritsyno, along with New Tsaritsyno and the nearest villages were combined under the name of Lenino village.

Created in March 1918, the revolutionary local government - the Soviet of Workers', Peasants' and Soldiers' Deputies, - was located in the First Cavalry Corps. In 1932, this building was rebuilt and became a 3-story building (the brick for completion was taken from the inner walls of the adjacent Second Cavalry Corps); it housed the executive committee of the Leninsky district of the Moscow region.

First Museum

In 1926, the palace and park ensemble was transferred to the jurisdiction of Glavnauka, and after - to the museum sub-department of Moscow Department of Public Education. On July 21, 1927, the Tsaritsyno Museum was opened in the building of the Third Cavalry Corps; a year later, the museum acquired the status of a local history museum. The first director and creator of the museum was V. V. Kazantsev. The collection of most valuable of Bazhenov's drawings and documents on the history and construction of the palace complex became the basis of the museum's exposition; objects from the excavations of the Tsaritsyno burial mounds were also displayed. The museum was famous; over 15,000 people visited it during the summer months.

The first repair and restoration work in Tsaritsyno also dates back to 1927: a group of restorers led by architect N.A. Pustarhanov in two years carried out the restoration of the Figured Gate, the Milovida and Nerastankino pavilions, the Golden Sheaf arbor (“Temple of Ceres”); conservation and strengthening of some ruined palace buildings was also done. At the same time, ponds were cleaned and the park was landscaped.

However, the museum did not last long in this form: in 1930, in according to the collectivization campaign, the exposition was based on models of agricultural products and diagrams of the development of the Leninsky district; the museum itself began to be called the "Leninsky District Local Horticultural and Garden Museum". Finally, in 1937 the museum was closed, and the village club with a cinema was set up in the building.

Maintenance during Soviet Era

The Khlebny Dom received a new life in Soviet times: in the early 1920s, communal apartments spontaneously appeared here. They lasted until the 1970s. In 1939, the temple on the territory of the palace and park ensemble was closed; the building was given over to host a transformer substation.

In 1936, by the order of the Moscow City Council, the architects M. O. Barshch and G. A. Zundblat developed a project for adapting the Tsaritsyno ensemble into a rest house. The implementation of these plans was halted by the Great Patriotic War.

At the end of the 1950s, the Milovida and Nerastankino pavilions, the Golden Sheaf pavilion, and a number of park bridges again required restoration. The work was carried out in 1958-1961 according to the project of the restorer M. V. Dyakonov; at the same time, under the guidance of architect V.I. Dolganov and forestry engineer E.S. Panferova, forest management work was carried out in the left-bank park.

The first project of the scientific restoration of the Tsaritsyno architectural and landscape monuments dates back to the end of the 1960s; it was developed at Mosproekt-3 under the guidance of architect V. Ya. Libson. However, the scale of the restoration work has become an obstacle to their implementation.

In 1960, Lenino became part of Moscow. In the 1970s, because of the rapid development of the nearby Orekhovo-Borisovo residential area, a security zone with an area of more than 1,000 hectares was established around Tsaritsyno and the cascade of the Tsareborisovsky Ponds. The zone of the palace and park ensemble was step by step freed from chaotic buildings.

Restoration at the end of the 20th - beginning of the 21st century 

- wrote a connoisseur of  Moscow  estates Yu. I. Shamurin in 1912, reflecting the contradictoriness of ideas for the Tsaritsyno preservation, which existed throughout the history of the palace ensemble. At the end of the 20th century, the restoration finally became a reality. In February 1984, the Tsaritsyno Ensemble received official status: the State Museum of Decorative and Handicraft Arts of the Peoples of the USSR was established. All palace buildings were transferred under its jurisdiction for the purpose of further restoration and use for museum expositions. In 1993, the museum was redesigned and renamed the Tsaritsyno State Museum-Reserve; it was soon included in the "List of historical and cultural monuments of federal significance".

Since the mid-1980s, scientific restoration of the Tsaritsyno objects has been carried out; almost all of them were restored by 2004. Remaining works include restoration of the Bread House, improving the park, restoring the park pavilions; it was also necessary to restore the Grand Palace.

In 2004, the museum-reserve was transferred under the jurisdiction of the Moscow authorities, and in September 2005, full-scale work was launched in Tsaritsyno to restore the Grand Palace and reconstruct the palace ensemble and park. The reconstruction project was developed in the architectural workshop No. 13 "Mosproekt-2" (the authors of the project are O. E. Galanicheva, N. G. Mukhin) under the leadership of Moscow Mayor Yu. M. Luzhkov and the head of "Mosproekt-2" M. M. Posokhin.

However, the Tsaritsyno reconstruction work caused an intense debate, which lasted throughout the implementation of the project. Critics of the project, among whom were prominent art critics, restorers and architects, noted that the new Tsaritsyno construction was carried out with violations of the legislation of protection of cultural monuments, and with unacceptable distortions of the historical appearance of Tsaritsyn. The idea of building an atrium in the Khlebny Dom came under criticism: the project supposed the construction of a glass-domed ceiling of the courtyard, which changed the silhouette of the building.

The greatest objections were raised by the project of restoration of the Grand Palace. This idea itself, according to critics, was erroneous: from the standpoint of preserving historical authenticity; it is impossible to restore what was destroyed in a natural way; you can not finish building something that was not completed due to historical circumstances. Architectural historian Grigory Revzin pointed out that back in the 19th century, the ruins of the Grand Tsaritsyno Palace were a self-sufficient monument, belonging to the era of romanticism, in which there was a cult of ruins. The dilapidated palace was an important part of the landscape park, forming a special emotional atmosphere around it. Dmitry Shvidkovsky, rector of the Moscow Institute of Architecture, also noted that the completion of the construction essentially destroyed the monument, since the perception of the building radically changed.

The next objection of the opponents of the project was  related to the appearance of the palace: if it was to be restored, then only strictly adhering to the principles of scientific restoration. And the project supposed to build the palace in a form in which it never existed. During the original construction of the palace, in 1793, according to the order of Catherine II, Matvey Kazakov made changes: the palace was lowered by one floor and obtained different roofs of the main buildings and towers. The Mosproekt-2 project combined both options - the actually existing walls of the final Kazakov version of the palace were planned to be completed with roofs from the original, unrealized version. Aleksey Komech, director of the Institute of Art Studies of the Russian Academy of Sciences and a consistent opponent of the plans to restore the palace, called this approach “fantasy restoration”. As an alternative to “fake”and “remake”, it was proposed to emphasize the authenticity of the ruined palace with the help of modern architectural technologies: for example, by placing some glass rooms inside the conserved ruins that could be used for museum purposes. One such project for the restoration of the palace was developed and approved shortly before the Tsaritsyno ensemble became the property of Moscow.

In response to critics, the Moscow authorities referred to the opinion of Muscovites: according to sociological surveys, residents of the Tsaritsyno district wanted to see the palace restored. It was also said that Moscow needs a large high-level museum complex in Tsaritsyno, and the reconstructed ensemble is suitable for this. Preservation of the palace as a ruin would require the construction of another large building on the territory of the ensemble to accommodate museum displays. M. M. Posokhin noted that the roof of the palace, which existed for about a hundred years, was temporary and was erected at the end of the 18th century by order of the then Moscow authorities in order to preserve the building. Therefore, it cannot be considered the author's intention. It was for this reason that a compilation project for the restoration of the palace arose, which was actively supported by Luzkov (Aleksey Komech did not agree with this argument, pointing out that the “historical” roof of the palace appeared a year before the death of Catherine II, and according to Kazakov’s plan). The continuity of the compilation project was also emphasized: it inherited the main ideas from the 1980s project, created by leading Soviet restorers (and at that time it passed all the necessary approvals).

Experts also criticized the newly builds objects, that did not previously exist: a transformer box in the "Gothic style", a glass pavilion leading to the underground lobby of the museum, a light-dynamic fountain on the Middle Tsaritsyno pond (it was noted that Catherine II did not love fountains).

Opponents of the reconstruction, seeing that their arguments were being ignored by the project leaders, appealed to Rosokhrankultura and the Prosecutor General's Office of the Russian Federation with a demand to stop the construction as violating the current legislation of cultural heritage protection, but to no avail. A. I. Komech, the initiator of the appeals, assumed the following outcome to be very likely:

Despite severe criticism from a number of experts, the restoration project of the Grand Tsaritsyno Palace was fully finished in 2005-2007. In a short time, a huge amount of construction and restoration work was carried out; many of them were unique. The words of Moscow Mayor Yu. M. Luzhkov became a kind of construction motto:

The official opening of the reconstructed palace complex, including the restored Grand Tsaritsyno Palace, took place on September 2, 2007, on the Day of the City of Moscow. The President of the Russian Federation Vladimir Putin took part in the celebration.

The restored Tsaritsyno palace and park ensemble acquired genuine love among Muscovites; the park, which immediately became a popular place for walking, has been open around the clock since November 2007 at the request of the citizens.

In 2008, the project for the restoration and reconstruction of the Tsaritsyno Ensemble was declared the absolute winner of the competition "The Best Implemented Project of 2007 in the field of investments and construction", which is held by the Moscow government, and the team of restorers who worked on the reconstruction of Tsaritsyno was awarded the Bernhard Remmers International Prize "For outstanding achievements in the restoration and preservation of architectural monuments”.

The main attractions of Tsaritsyno

Palace ensemble

Bazhenov's buildings 

It consists of more than 20 buildings, most of which were built by the architect Vasiliy Bazhenov in 1775 - 1785 and give Tsaritsyno its recognizable appearance. All of them were built in Moscow Baroque and Neo-Gothic style. It is also claimed that the decoration of the buildings includes many Masonic symbols (Bazhenov was a Freemason), and the meaning of many of them is still not solved.

Kazakov's Big Palace 
However, the largest building of the complex - the Grand Palace - was designed by Bazhenov's student, Matvey Kazakov. Construction began under the command of Kazakov in 1786, but was not fully completed. The unfinished palace stood half-ruined for more than 200 years. It was finished only in 2007 by architectural restorers according to historical drawings.

Later buildings 
Many small architectural forms, pavilions, “picturesque ruins” in the park were erected in the 19th century, in the era of romanticism. This happened after Tsaritsyno ceased to be a personal royal residence and became a public park.

Park and ponds 
The Tsaritsyno palace and park ensemble, covering an area of more than 100 hectares, is located on a hilly area crossed by ravines. It encircles three ponds.

Park 

The park began to be arranged in the 1770s, simultaneously with the beginning of the palace construction. It was created mainly by the palace's first architect Bazhenov and English garden masters Francis Reed and Ion Murno.

The park is designed as a landscape park, with picturesque views of the pond and the buildings of the palace from its paths. The most beautiful spots are marked by pavilions and other small buildings. Sculptures are also installed in some places.

Vyatichi’s burial mounds 
The place where Tsaritsyno is located was inhabited long before Catherine's reign. One of the first inhabitants was the East Slavic Tribe of Vyatichi between the 9th and 12th centuries.

In the depths of the Tsaritsyno park, their burial mounds are still preserved. They attracted the attention of historians and archaeologists as early as the 19th century. The most complete archaeological excavations date back to 1944. A group led by A.V. Artsikhovsky discovered a number of interesting items, including tools, which until then had not been found in similar burial mounds in the Moscow region. The findings were subsequently transferred to the Tsaritsyno Museum-Reserve and laid the foundation for its archaeological collection.

Ponds and islands 
The Tsaritsynskiye ponds  are older than the manor itself.

The Tsaritsynskiye ponds cascade was formed during the XVI-XVIII centuries. The oldest is the Borisovsky pond, which was founded during the reign of Boris Godunov. The upper and lower Tsaritsynskiy ponds appeared when the estate of Chernaya Gryaz belonged to the boyars Streshnevs: the lower pond appeared in the XVII century. All the subsequent owners of the Chyornaya Gryaz paid a lot of attention to maintaining the ponds, building and reconstructing dams, water mills, creating artificial islands. The Middle Tsaritsynsky Pond appeared in the 1980s after the construction of a high dam, along which the route of Novotsaritsynsky Highway divided the Lower Pond into two parts. Directly adjacent to the Grand Palais and park ensemble are the Upper and Middle ponds. They form a natural boundary of the ensemble from the west and an important part of it. Some of the palace buildings and pavilions of the landscape park are oriented towards the ponds.

There are picturesque islands on the ponds, the most famous of which are Bird Island and Mermaid Island.

Several natural springs flow into ponds within the park.

Swimming is prohibited, but boating and catamarans are allowed and very popular.

Fountain 
During the 2000s restoration, a light and music fountain was installed on Horseshoe Island in the Middle Tsaritsyno Pond. It is one of the biggest fountains of that type in Moscow.

Architectural features of the Grand Palais 
The basis of Bazhenov's architectural plan is formed by two equal wings, square in plan, intended for the apartments of Catherine II (right-wing) and  Crown-prince Paul  (left-wing). 

The palace, despite its vivid neo-Gothic features (towers, lancet arches) in its solution is close to the canons of Classicism: strict symmetry, the tripartite division of the facades, the overall calm and balanced proportions, the monumental details (semi-columns in the corners of towers, fascias, loggias of side-wings). The hipped ends of the towers bear features tracing back to the towers of the Moscow Kremlin. In many respects, the Great Palace shows a different approach to the task of building a country residence "in the Gothic style".

The palace was not completed due to the sudden death of Catherine II. By 1796 it already had a temporary roof painted black. This gave the building a gloomy appearance which affected the perception of contemporaries of the construction. It was only by the middle of the 19th century that critics started to give credit for the palace's architectural features.

The ruined palace, which had not been used in any way during its history, was converted into a modern museum complex in 2005-2007.

Gallery

External links and references

  
Photo of Palace Complex and Park
Reviews on TripAdvisor  
Tsaritsyno Park - One of the Best Museums in Moscow 

Specific

Parks and gardens in Moscow
Museums in Moscow
Palaces in Moscow
Royal residences in Russia
Vasili Bazhenov buildings
Gothic Revival architecture in Russia
Art museums and galleries in Moscow
Folk art museums and galleries
Decorative arts museums in Russia
Cultural heritage monuments of federal significance in Moscow